Enqelab Square is a square in downtown Esfahan, Iran.

Transportation
  Chahar Bagh Abbasi Street
  Motahari Street
  Kamaloddin Esmaeil Street
  Si-o-se Pol
  Enqelab Metro Station

Streets in Isfahan
Squares in Iran